Karabulak, Azerbaijan or Karabulag, Azerbaijan or Gharabulagh, Azerbaijan or Ghrabulagh, Azerbaijan or Karbulag, Azerbaijan or Qarabulaq, Azerbaijan or Karabulakh, Azerbaijan or Gharaboulagh, Azerbaijan may refer to:
 Gömür, Davachi
 Qarabulaq, Gadabay
 Qarabulaq, Gobustan
 Qarabulaq, Goygol
 Qarabulaq, Khizi
 Qarabulaq, Khojali
 Qarabulaq, Oghuz
 Qarabulaq, Quba